Lipa City held its local elections on Monday, May 13, 2019, as a part of the 2019 Philippine general election. The voters will elect candidates for the elective local posts in the city: the mayor, vice mayor, the congressman (which will represent Batangas' sixth district which is composed of just the city), two provincial board members, and the 12 members of its city council.

There are a total of 162,042 people who voted out of the 200,706 registered voters. Incumbent Vice Mayor Eric Africa won in the mayoralty race garnering 78,109 votes. Africa had 1,598 votes over his closest rival Bernadette Sabili, wife of incumbent Mayor Meynardo Sabili. Incumbent councilor Mark Aries Luancing won as Vice Mayor.

Background

Mayoral and Vice Mayoral elections
Incumbent Mayor Meynardo Sabili is now on his third and final term as Mayor of the City of Lipa. He assumed the mayorship in 2010, defeating then-incumbent and former 4th District Representative Oscar Gozos. This is despite Sabili's disqualification to run because of residency dispute. Sabili, a former Provincial Board Member used to be a registered voter Barangay Sico 1, San Juan, Batangas and transferred to Barangay Pinagtong-Ulan, Lipa City. However, the Supreme Court annulled and dismissed the Commission on Elections' ruling on Sabili's cancellation of his Certificate of Candidacy. He is running for representative of the 6th District of Batangas, which comprises only the city itself, under the Nationalist People's Coalition. His wife, Bernadette Sabili is his party's nominee. This will be Sabili's third time that she will run in the elections. She first ran for Representative of the 4th District of Batangas, when Lipa is still part of that district, but was defeated by then-incumbent Mark Llandro Mendoza. She then ran again for representative of the newly-created 6th District, but was defeated again by former Mayor and then-incumbent Batangas Governor Vilma Santos-Recto. If elected, she will be the city's second female mayor next to Santos-Recto. Her running mate is former City Mayor Ruben Umali. Umali served as city mayor from 1986 to 1998. Sabili's platform is to continue the programs of her husband.

Her opponents are incumbent Vice Mayor Eric Africa who is running under the Nacionalista Party, the party of incumbent Representative and former City Mayor and Governor Vilma Santos-Recto. Africa served as city councilor from 1998 to 2007 and from 2010 to 2013 before being elected as Vice Mayor in 2013 and reelected in 2016. His running mate is incumbent councilor Mark Aries Luancing. Their platform is to resolve the problems that the city is enduring such as the worsening traffic in the city and garbage problems in the city. Another mayoralty candidate is lawyer Mario Panganiban with Ricardo Leyesa as his running mate. Incumbent councilor Merlo Silva is running as Vice Mayor.

Congressional election
Incumbent Representative Vilma Santos-Recto, is running for reelection. Recto became its first female City Mayor from 1998 until she was elected first female Governor of Batangas in 2007 and became the first representative of the newly-created 6th District of Batangas, that comprises only the city itself. Her main opponent is incumbent Mayor Meynard Sabili who is running under the Nationalist People's Coalition. This is Sabili's third congressional attempt. He ran in 2001 and 2007 as Representative of the 4th District of Batangas (where Lipa is still part of it), but was defeated by his erstwhile predecessor Oscar Gozos and Mark Llandro Mendoza, respectively. However, NPC withdrew his nomination two hours before the deadline of filing of Certificates of Canidacies. However, in the certified list of candidates and in the official ballot, Sabili is still running under NPC.

Congressional election

6th District (Lipa City) 
Incumbent Vilma Santos-Recto is running for reelection. Her main opponent is incumbent Lipa Mayor Meynardo Sabili.

Provincial Board Elections

6th District
Incumbent Lydio Lopez, Jr. is running for reelection. Incumbent Rowena Africa is term-limited.

|-

|-

|-
|colspan=5 bgcolor=black|

|-

Mayoralty and Vice Mayoralty Elections

Mayor
Incumbent Mayor Meynardo Sabili is now on third and final term as Mayor of the City of Lipa and he is ineligible to run for another term. He assumed the mayorship in 2010, defeating then-incumbent and former 4th District Representative Oscar Gozos. This is despite Sabili's disqualification to run because of residency dispute. Sabili, a former Provincial Board Member used to be a registered voter Barangay Sico 1, San Juan, Batangas and transferred to Barangay Pinagtong-Ulan, Lipa City. However, the Supreme Court annulled and dismissed the Commission on Elections' ruling on Sabili's cancellation of his Certificate of Candidacy. He is now running for Representative of the 6th District of Batangas,  which only comprises the City of Lipa.

His wife, Bernadette Sabili is running in his place as Mayor. Her opponents is incumbent Vice Mayor Eric Africa and Mario Panganiban.

Vice Mayor
Incumbent Vice Mayor Eric Africa is running for Mayor. His party nominated incumbent councilor Mark Aries Luancing. His main opponents are Ricardo Leyesa, incumbent councilor Merlo Silva and former Mayor Ruben Umali.

City Council
Eight incumbent councilors are running for reelections, upon which both Team Bangon Lipa and Team Sabili-Umali had four reelectionists for each team. Team Bangon Lipa had incumbent councilors Leonilo Catipon, Oscar Gozos II, Camille Angeline Lopez and Avior Rocafort. Both Lopez and Rocafort are former allies of Mayor Meynard Sabili. While Team Sabili-Umali had incumbent councilors Emmanuel De Castro, Nonato Monfero, Joel Pua and Ralph Peter Umali. Incumbents Mark Aries Luancing, Gwendolyn Wong, Merlo Silva, and Aries Emmanuel Mendoza are retiring. Both Luancing and Silva are challengers for City Vice Mayor, Wong is retiring from politics and Mendoza is running for provincial board member.

Incumbents are expressed in italics.

By ticket

Team Bangon Lipa

Team Sabili-Umali

Independent

Councilors
As per results of the elections, 8 out of 12 seats were occupied by Team Bangon Lipa. 6 of them are reelectionists (4 from Team Bangon Lipa and 2 from Team Sabili-Umali) while other 6 are newly-elected councilors (4 from Team Bangon Lipa and 2 from Team Sabili-Umali).

References

2019 Philippine local elections
May 2019 events in the Philippines
Elections in Lipa
2019 elections in Calabarzon